The members of the New Jersey Legislature are chosen from 40 electoral districts. Each district elects one Senator and two Assemblymen.

New Jersey is one of only seven states with nested state legislative districts, in which the lower house's districts are coextensive with a single state Senate seat. In New Jersey, each district elects one Senator and two Assembly members. (States which have similar practices are Arizona, Idaho, Maryland, North Dakota, South Dakota and Washington).

Districts are reapportioned decennially by the New Jersey Apportionment Commission following each United States Census, as provided by Article IV, Section III of the state Constitution.

The legislative districts listed below went into effect with the swearing in of the 210th Legislature in 2002. They were used for regular elections from 2001 through 2009 (special elections through 2010), following the 2000 United States Census. The November 2011 elections were held for representatives of districts defined in the 2011 apportionment.

District 1

Avalon Borough,
Buena Borough,
Buena Vista Township,
Cape May City,
Cape May Point Borough,
Dennis Township,
Lower Township,
Maurice River Township,
Middle Township,
Millville City,
North Wildwood City,
Ocean City,
Sea Isle City,
Somers Point City,
Stone Harbor Borough,
Upper Township,
Vineland City,
West Cape May Borough,
West Wildwood Borough,
Wildwood City,
Wildwood Crest Borough,
Woodbine Borough

District 2

Absecon City,
Atlantic City,
Brigantine City,
Corbin City,
Egg Harbor City,
Egg Harbor Township,
Estell Manor City,
Galloway Township,
Hamilton Township,
Linwood City,
Longport Borough,
Margate City,
Mullica Township,
Northfield City,
Pleasantville City,
Port Republic City,
Ventnor City,
Weymouth Township

District 3

Alloway Township,
Bridgeton City,
Carneys Point Township,
Clayton Borough,
Commercial Township,
Deerfield Township,
Downe Township,
East Greenwich Township,
Elk Township,
Elmer Borough,
Elsinboro Township,
Fairfield Township,
Greenwich Township (Cumberland),
Greenwich Township (Gloucester),
Harrison Township,
Hopewell Township,
Lawrence Township,
Logan Township,
Lower Alloways Creek Township,
Mannington Township,
Mantua Township,
National Park Borough,
Oldmans Township,
Paulsboro Borough,
Penns Grove Borough,
Pennsville Township,
Pilesgrove Township,
Pittsgrove Township,
Quinton Township,
Salem City,
Shiloh Borough,
South Harrison Township,
Stow Creek Township,
Swedesboro Borough,
Upper Deerfield Township,
Upper Pittsgrove Township,
Wenonah Borough,
West Deptford Township,
Woodstown Borough,
Woolwich Township

District 4

Clementon Borough,
Franklin Township,
Glassboro Borough,
Gloucester Township,
Laurel Springs Borough,
Lindenwold Borough,
Monroe Township,
Newfield Borough,
Pitman Borough,
Washington Township

District 5

Audubon Borough,
Barrington Borough,
Bellmawr Borough,
Brooklawn Borough,
Camden City,
Deptford Township,
Gloucester City,
Haddon Heights Borough,
Hi-Nella Borough,
Lawnside Borough,
Magnolia Borough,
Mount Ephraim Borough,
Runnemede Borough,
Somerdale Borough,
Stratford Borough,
Westville Borough,
Woodbury City,
Woodbury Heights Borough,
Woodlynne Borough

District 6

Audubon Park Borough,
Berlin Borough,
Berlin Township,
Cherry Hill Township,
Chesilhurst Borough,
Collingswood Borough,
Gibbsboro Borough,
Haddon Township,
Haddonfield Borough,
Oaklyn Borough,
Pine Hill Borough,
Pine Valley Borough,
Tavistock Borough,
Voorhees Township,
Waterford Township,
Winslow Township

District 7

Beverly City,
Burlington City,
Burlington Township,
Cinnaminson Township,
Delanco Township,
Delran Township,
Edgewater Park Township,
Florence Township,
Maple Shade Township,
Merchantville Borough,
Mount Holly Township,
Palmyra Borough,
Pennsauken Township,
Riverside Township,
Riverton Borough,
Westampton Township,
Willingboro Township

District 8

Eastampton Township,
Evesham Township,
Hainesport Township,
Lumberton Township,
Mansfield Township,
Medford Lakes Borough,
Medford Township,
Moorestown Township,
Mount Laurel Township,
Pemberton Borough,
Pemberton Township,
Shamong Township,
Southampton Township,
Springfield Township,
Tabernacle Township,
Woodland Township,
Wrightstown Borough

District 9

Barnegat Light Borough,
Barnegat Township,
Bass River Township,
Beach Haven Borough,
Beachwood Borough,
Berkeley Township,
Eagleswood Township,
Folsom Borough,
Hammonton Town,
Harvey Cedars Borough,
Lacey Township,
Lakehurst Borough,
Little Egg Harbor Township,
Long Beach Township,
Manchester Township,
Ocean Gate Borough,
Ocean Township,
Pine Beach Borough,
Ship Bottom Borough,
Stafford Township,
Surf City Borough,
Tuckerton Borough,
Washington Township

District 10

Bay Head Borough,
Brick Township,
Island Heights Borough,
Lavallette Borough,
Manasquan Borough,
Mantoloking Borough,
Point Pleasant Beach Borough,
Point Pleasant Borough,
Seaside Heights Borough,
Seaside Park Borough,
South Toms River Borough,
Toms River Township (formerly Dover Township)

District 11

Allenhurst Borough,
Asbury Park City,
Atlantic Highlands Borough,
Avon-by-the-Sea Borough,
Belmar Borough,
Bradley Beach Borough,
Brielle Borough,
Deal Borough,
Eatontown Borough,
Highlands Borough,
Interlaken Borough,
Lake Como Borough (formerly South Belmar),
Loch Arbour Village,
Long Branch City,
Monmouth Beach Borough,
Neptune City Borough,
Neptune Township,
Ocean Township,
Rumson Borough,
Sea Bright Borough,
Sea Girt Borough,
Spring Lake Borough,
Spring Lake Heights Borough,
Wall Township,
West Long Branch Borough

District 12

Colts Neck Township,
East Windsor Township,
Englishtown Borough,
Fair Haven Borough,
Freehold Borough,
Freehold Township,
Hightstown Borough,
Little Silver Borough,
Manalapan Township,

Millstone Township,
Oceanport Borough,
Red Bank Borough,
Shrewsbury Borough,
Shrewsbury Township,
Tinton Falls Borough

District 13

Aberdeen Township,
Hazlet Township,
Holmdel Township,
Keansburg Borough,
Keyport Borough,
Marlboro Township,
Matawan Borough,
Middletown Township,
Old Bridge Township,
Union Beach Borough

Note: This district is not geographically contiguous, as Middletown Township is not geographically contiguous. The Sandy Hook peninsula is a part of Middletown Township, but is not contiguous with the remainder of the Township. However, as the entirety of the non-contiguous section of the district is occupied by the Gateway National Recreation Area (a national park), where there are no residents, this lack of contiguity is essentially inconsequential.

District 14

Cranbury Township,
Hamilton Township,
Jamesburg Borough,
Monroe Township,
Plainsboro Township,
South Brunswick Township,
West Windsor Township

District 15

Ewing Township,
Hopewell Borough,
Hopewell Township,
Lawrence Township,
Pennington Borough,
Princeton Borough,
Princeton Township,
Trenton City

District 16

Bedminster Township,
Bernards Township,
Bernardsville Borough,
Bound Brook Borough,
Branchburg Township,
Bridgewater Township,
Far Hills Borough,
Hillsborough Township,
Manville Borough,
Mendham Borough,
Millstone Borough,
Montgomery Township,
Peapack-Gladstone Borough,
Raritan Borough,
Rocky Hill Borough,
Somerville Borough,
South Bound Brook Borough

District 17

Franklin Township,
Highland Park Borough,
Milltown Borough,
New Brunswick City,
North Brunswick Township,
Piscataway Township

District 18

East Brunswick Township,
Edison Township,
Helmetta Borough,
Metuchen Borough,
South Plainfield Borough,
South River Borough,
Spotswood Borough

District 19

Carteret Borough,
Perth Amboy City,
Sayreville Borough,
South Amboy City,
Woodbridge Township

District 20

Elizabeth City,
Kenilworth Borough,
Roselle Borough,
Union Township

District 21

Berkeley Heights Township,
Chatham Township,
Cranford Township,
Garwood Borough,
Harding Township,
Long Hill Township,
Madison Borough,
Millburn Township,
Mountainside Borough,
New Providence Borough,
Roselle Park Borough,
Springfield Township,
Summit City,
Warren Township,
Watchung Borough,
Westfield Town

District 22

Clark Township,
Dunellen Borough,
Fanwood Borough,
Green Brook Township,
Linden City,
Middlesex Borough,
North Plainfield Borough,
Plainfield City,
Rahway City,
Scotch Plains Township,
Winfield Township

District 23

Alexandria Township,
Allamuchy Township,
Alpha Borough,
Belvidere Town,
Bethlehem Township,
Blairstown Township,
Bloomsbury Borough,
Clinton Town,
Clinton Township,
Delaware Township,
East Amwell Township,
Flemington Borough,
Franklin Township (Hunterdon County),
Franklin Township (Warren County),
Frelinghuysen Township,
Frenchtown Borough,
Glen Gardner Borough,
Greenwich Township,
Hackettstown Town,
Hampton Borough,
Hardwick Township,
Harmony Township,
High Bridge Borough,
Holland Township,
Hope Township,
Independence Township,
Kingwood Township,
Knowlton Township,
Lambertville City,
Lebanon Borough,
Lebanon Township,
Liberty Township,
Lopatcong Township,
Mansfield Township,
Milford Borough,
Oxford Township,
Phillipsburg Town,
Pohatcong Township,
Raritan Township,
Readington Township,
Stockton Borough,
Union Township,
Washington Borough,
Washington Township,
West Amwell Township,
White Township

District 24

Andover Borough,
Andover Township,
Branchville Borough,
Byram Township,
Califon Borough,
Chester Borough,
Chester Township,
Frankford Township,
Franklin Borough,
Fredon Township,
Green Township,
Hamburg Borough,
Hampton Township,
Hardyston Township,
Hopatcong Borough,
Lafayette Township,
Montague Township,
Mount Olive Township,
Netcong Borough,
Newton Town,
Ogdensburg Borough,
Sandyston Township,
Sparta Township,
Stanhope Borough,
Stillwater Township,
Sussex Borough,
Tewksbury Township,
Vernon Township,
Walpack Township,
Wantage Township,
Washington Township

District 25

Boonton Town,
Boonton Township,
Denville Township,
Dover Town,
Jefferson Township,
Mendham Township,
Mine Hill Township,
Morris Township,
Morristown Town,
Mount Arlington Borough,
Mountain Lakes Borough,
Randolph Township,
Rockaway Borough,
Rockaway Township,
Roxbury Township,
Victory Gardens Borough,
Wharton Borough

District 26

Bloomingdale Borough,
Butler Borough,
Chatham Borough,
East Hanover Township,
Florham Park Borough,
Hanover Township,
Kinnelon Borough,
Lincoln Park Borough,
Montville Township,
Morris Plains Borough,
Parsippany-Troy Hills Township,
Pequannock Township,
Pompton Lakes Borough,
Riverdale Borough,
West Milford Township

District 27

Caldwell Township,
Essex Fells Township,
Fairfield Township,
Livingston Township,
Maplewood Township,
Newark City (partial),
North Caldwell Township,
Orange Township,
Roseland Borough,
South Orange Village Township,
West Caldwell Township,
West Orange Township

District 28

Belleville Township,
Bloomfield Township,
Irvington Township,
Newark City (partial)

District 29

Hillside Township,
Newark City (partial)

District 30

Allentown Borough,
Bordentown City,
Bordentown Township,
Chesterfield Township,
Farmingdale Borough,
Fieldsboro Borough,
Howell Township,
Jackson Township,
Lakewood Township,
New Hanover Township,
North Hanover Township,
Plumsted Township,
Roosevelt Borough,
Upper Freehold Township,
Robbinsville Township (known as Washington Township until 2007)

District 31

Bayonne,
Jersey City (partial)

District 32

East Newark Borough,
Fairview Borough,
Harrison Town,
Jersey City (partial),
Kearny Town,
North Bergen Township,
Secaucus Town

District 33

Guttenberg Town,
Hoboken City,
Jersey City (partial),
Union City,
Weehawken Township,
West New York Town

District 34

Clifton City,
East Orange City,
Glen Ridge Township,
Montclair Township,
Woodland Park Borough (formerly West Paterson)

District 35

Glen Rock Borough,
Haledon Borough,
Hawthorne Borough,
North Haledon Borough,
Paterson City,
Prospect Park Borough,
Totowa Borough

District 36

Carlstadt Borough,
East Rutherford Borough,
Garfield City,
Lyndhurst Township,
Moonachie Borough,
North Arlington Borough,
Nutley Township,
Passaic City,
Rutherford Borough,
Wallington Borough,
Wood-Ridge Borough

District 37

Bergenfield Borough,
Bogota Borough,
Englewood City,
Englewood Cliffs Borough,
Hackensack City,
Leonia Borough,
Maywood Borough,
Palisades Park Borough,
Ridgefield Park Village,
Rochelle Park Township,
Teaneck Township,
Tenafly Borough

District 38

Cliffside Park Borough,
Edgewater Borough,
Elmwood Park Borough,
Fair Lawn Borough,
Fort Lee Borough,
Hasbrouck Heights Borough,
Little Ferry Borough,
Lodi Borough,
Paramus Borough,
Ridgefield Borough,
Saddle Brook Township,
South Hackensack Township,
Teterboro Borough

District 39

Allendale Borough,
Alpine Borough,
Closter Borough,
Cresskill Borough,
Demarest Borough,
Dumont Borough,
Emerson Borough,
Harrington Park Borough,
Haworth Borough,
Hillsdale Borough,
Ho-Ho-Kus Borough,
Montvale Borough,
New Milford Borough,
Northvale Borough,
Norwood Borough,
Old Tappan Borough,
Oradell Borough,
Park Ridge Borough,
Ramsey Borough,
River Edge Borough,
River Vale Township,
Rockleigh Borough,
Saddle River Borough,
Upper Saddle River Borough,
Waldwick Borough,
Washington Township,
Westwood Borough,
Woodcliff Lake Borough,

District 40

Cedar Grove Township,
Franklin Lakes Borough,
Little Falls Township,
Mahwah Township,
Midland Park Borough,
Oakland Borough,
Pequannock Township,
Ridgewood Village,
Ringwood Borough,
Totowa Borough,
Verona Township,
Wanaque Borough,
Wayne Township,
Woodland Park Borough,
Wyckoff Township

References

External links
New Jersey Legislature Web Site

2001 New Jersey elections
Politics of New Jersey
New Jersey legislative districts